Vatinei César Moreira dos Santos better known simply as Dinei (born 10 December 1979 in Campos dos Goytacazes) is a Brazilian professional football player.

External sources
 
 Profile at Srbijafudbal

Living people
1979 births
Brazilian footballers
Brazilian expatriate footballers
Campo Grande Atlético Clube players
PFC Belasitsa Petrich players
First Professional Football League (Bulgaria) players
Expatriate footballers in Bulgaria
Pogoń Szczecin players
Expatriate footballers in Poland
FK Srem players
Serbian First League players
Expatriate footballers in Serbia
Brazilian expatriate sportspeople in Bulgaria
Brazilian expatriate sportspeople in Poland
Association football midfielders
People from Campos dos Goytacazes
Sportspeople from Rio de Janeiro (state)